Adrienne C. Moore (born August 14, 1980) is an American actress. She is known for her role as Cindy "Black Cindy" Hayes in the Netflix comedy-drama series Orange Is the New Black (2013–2019).

Life and career
Moore was born in Nashville, Tennessee, and grew up in Nashville and Georgia. In 2003, Moore graduated with a B.A. from Northwestern University, where she studied psychology, history, and religion. She began her career on stage, appearing in Off-Broadway productions. On television, she had small parts in Blue Bloods and 30 Rock, before her role on Orange Is the New Black.

Moore is known for her role as Cindy "Black Cindy" Hayes in the Netflix comedy-drama series Orange Is the New Black. She was a recurring cast member in the first two seasons and was promoted to series regular for season 3.

In 2014, Moore received her first NAACP Image Award nomination for her performance in the series. Moore also co-starred in the film The Lennon Report, about true events concerning the night John Lennon was shot and killed in 1980.

Since 2021 she has played Detective Kelly Duff of the CBC Television/Amazon Freevee show Pretty Hard Cases. 

Adrienne attended Benjamin Elijah Mays High School and graduated in 1999. She has a fraternal twin sister, Annette Moore, and an older brother, Wayne Moore, Jr.

Filmography

References

External links

Living people
African-American actresses
American television actresses
American film actresses
American stage actresses
Actresses from Nashville, Tennessee
21st-century American actresses
1980 births
Northwestern University alumni
21st-century African-American women
21st-century African-American people
20th-century African-American people
20th-century African-American women